is an action photography video game developed by Tomcat System and published by Irem for the PC Engine. The game is centered on taking photographs of the interactive environments through which the player progresses.

Story
David Goldman is an amateur photographer, who always loved to take pictures. One day, he went to Los Angeles Photography School to study more about taking pictures. Every day, David commutes on the crowded trains, but trained and learned better in the academy so he can achieve his dreams on becoming the best photographer he ever wished for. He was happy at that time, but suddenly misfortune hit him. David's parents suddenly died in a plane crash, leaving him orphaned and all alone. He loved his parents deeply and cried at their burial, thinking that they will come back. David lost his confidence and is about to leave the academy to live a lonely and sad life. However, for Dean, the principal of the academy saw him and made an unexpected proposal to him. The principal said if he completed 8 tests by taking 8 special photograph shots in 8 different locations, then he's allowed to graduate in the academy. Unsure about this offer, David still accepted the test and did everything he could to pass.

Gameplay
Players must guide David through the given level attempting to photograph rare or exceptional occurrences which transpire around him, all the while evading obstacles that may injure him. As he take a successful shot of an unexpected situation, he is rewarded with extra film, increased speed and bigger camera lens. The player can only advance to the next stage if the required score is met.

Re-release and sequel
In 2002, the Japanese version of Gekibo was re-released on the PlayStation as Volume 94 of the Simple 1500 Series under the title The Cameraman: Gekisha Boy Omakefu. This version features an added stage and an unlockable cooperative gameplay with a second player as the Gekisha Girl.

A sequel for the PlayStation 2 titled Polaroid Pete (or Gekisha Boy 2 in Japan) was released in Europe and Japan in 2001. However, there were no further words about a European release and the publisher suddenly disappeared. A competition was held in the UK "Official Playstation Magazine", but it is unknown if they announced any winners after the cancellation.

Notes

References

External links 
Screenshots from VG Museum
Review

1992 video games
Action video games
D3 Publisher games
Irem games
Japan-exclusive video games
Photography games
PlayStation (console) games
Tomcat System games
TurboGrafx-16 games
Video games developed in Japan
Single-player video games